Saddle River is a borough in Bergen County, in the U.S. state of New Jersey. The borough contains both stately historic homes and estates, as well as newer mansions. It is popular among residents seeking spacious properties in a countryside-like setting, while also having proximity to New York City.

Saddle River is one of the highest-income small municipalities in the United States and was ranked 9th in New Jersey in per capita income as of the 2010 Census. Saddle River was ranked among the Top 100 in Forbes Most Expensive Zip Codes in America in 2010. In 1989, Saddle River was ranked the richest suburb in the nation among those with 2,500 or more people (based on per capita income). The town has been home to notable residents including former US Presidents, celebrities, athletes, and businessmen (See Notable people list).

The New York Times described Saddle River as "a place where one can still keep horses—one per acre—see a deer, listen to the birds, and catch a fish in the trout stream that gives the town its name."

As of the 2020 United States census, the borough's population was 3,372, an increase of 220 (+7.0%) from the 2010 census count of 3,152, which in turn reflected a decline of 49 (−1.5%) from the 3,201 counted in the 2000 census.

Saddle River is a dry town, where alcohol cannot be sold.

History
European settlement of the area that is now Saddle River traces back to 1675, when the Lenape Native Americans sold a stretch of land along the Saddle River to Albert Zabriskie. Saddle River was incorporated as a borough by an act of the New Jersey Legislature on November 22, 1894, from portions of Orvil Township, based on the results of a referendum held three days earlier. The borough was formed during the "Boroughitis" phenomenon then sweeping through Bergen County, in which 26 boroughs were formed in the county in 1894 alone. Saddle River's referendum passed on November 19, one day before the referendum passed for the formation of the neighboring borough of Upper Saddle River. An additional portion of Orvil Township was annexed in 1903.

The borough is named after the Saddle River, which flows through the borough and is a tributary of the Passaic River, which in turn was named for a stream and valley in Saddell, Argyll, Scotland.

Historic sites
Saddle River is home to the following locations on the National Register of Historic Places:
 Achenbach House – 184 Chestnut Ridge Road (added 1979, burned down in 2004)
 Ackerman House – 136 Chestnut Ridge Road (added 1983)
 Abram Ackerman House – 199 East Saddle River Road (added 1983)
 Garret and Maria Ackerman House – 150 East Saddle River Road (added 1986)
 Garret Augustus Ackerman House – 212 East Saddle River Road (added 1986)
 Ackerman-Dewsnap House – 176 East Saddle River Road (added 1986)
 Ackerman-Smith House – 171 East Allendale Road (added 1986)
 Ackerman-Dater House – 109 West Saddle River Road (added 1983)
 J. J. Carlock House – 2 Chestnut Ridge Road (added 1986)
 Evangelical Lutheran Church of Saddle River and Ramapough Building – 96 East Allendale Road (added 1986)
 Alonzo Foringer House and Studio – 107 and 107B East Saddle River Road (added 1986)
 Hopper House – 45 West Saddle River Road (added 1984)
 Joe Jefferson Clubhouse – 29 East Saddle River Road (added 1986)
 O'Blenis House – 220 East Saddle River Road (added 1986)
 Garret K. Osborn House and Barn – 88 and 90 East Allendale Road (added 1986)
 Dr. E. G. Roy House – 229 West Saddle River Road (added 1986)
 Saddle River Center Historic District – Along West Saddle River Road at jct. of East Allendale Road (added 1986)
 Stillwell-Preston House – 9 East Saddle River Road (added 1986)
 Andries Thomas Van Buskirk House – 164 East Saddle River Road (added 1983)
 Laurance Thomas Van Buskirk House – 116 East Saddle River Road (added 1983)
 B. C. Wandell House-The Cedars – 214, 223, and 224 West Saddle River Road (added 1986)
 F. L. Wandell Estate and Ward Factory Site – 255–261 East Saddle River Road (added 1990)
 Dr. John Christie Ware Bungalow – 246 East Saddle River Road (added 1986)

Geography
According to the United States Census Bureau, the borough had a total area of 4.97 square miles (12.86 km2), including 4.91 square miles (12.73 km2) of land and 0.05 square miles (0.13 km2) of water (1.03%).

The borough is bounded by eight municipalities in Bergen County: the boroughs of Allendale, Hillsdale, Ho-Ho-Kus, Ramsey, Upper Saddle River, Waldwick, Washington Township and Woodcliff Lake.

Mount Pleasant and Villa Marie Claire are unincorporated communities located within Saddle River.

Property values 
The median home value in Saddle River was $1,960,294, compared to $596,000 for Bergen County, $440,000 for the state of NJ, and $331,000 for the US overall, as of March 31, 2022.

Demographics

2010 census

The Census Bureau's 2006–2010 American Community Survey showed that (in 2010 inflation-adjusted dollars) median household income was $97,197 (with a margin of error of +/− $48,774) and the median family income was $162,500 (+/− $61,174). Males had a median income of $162,740 (+/− $30,154) versus $56,339 (+/− $25,675) for females. The per capita income for the borough was $86,812 (+/− $16,562). About 0.9% of families and 1.3% of the population were below the poverty line, including 3.1% of those under age 18 and none of those age 65 or over.

Same-sex couples headed seven households in 2010, an increase from the six counted in 2000.

2000 census
As of the 2000 United States census there were 3,201 people, 1,118 households, and 926 families residing in the borough. The population density was 642.6 people per square mile (248.2/km2). There were 1,183 housing units at an average density of 237.5 per square mile (91.7/km2). The racial makeup of the borough was 89.85% White, 0.75% African American, 7.15% Asian, 0.03% Pacific Islander, 0.81% from other races, and 1.41% from two or more races. Hispanic or Latino of any race were 2.56% of the population.

There were 1,118 households, out of which 31.7% had children under the age of 18 living with them, 76.6% were married couples living together, 3.8% had a female householder with no husband present, and 17.1% were non-families. 14.2% of all households were made up of individuals, and 8.5% had someone living alone who was 65 years of age or older. The average household size was 2.77 and the average family size was 3.05.

In the borough the age distribution of the population shows 22.5% under the age of 18, 4.7% from 18 to 24, 19.5% from 25 to 44, 32.9% from 45 to 64, and 20.4% who were 65 years of age or older. The median age was 47 years. For every 100 females, there were 92.8 males. For every 100 females age 18 and over, there were 93.0 males.

The median income for a household in the borough was $134,289, and the median income for a family was $152,169. Males had a median income of $100,000 versus $61,458 for females. The per capita income for the borough was $85,934. About 2.8% of families and 3.6% of the population were below the poverty line, including 2.4% of those under age 18 and 10.3% of those age 65 or over.

Government

Local government
Saddle River is governed under the Borough form of New Jersey municipal government, which is used in 218 municipalities (of the 564) statewide, making it the most common form of government in New Jersey. The governing body is comprised of a mayor and a Borough Council comprising six council members, on a partisan basis as part of the November general election. A mayor is elected directly by the voters to a four-year term. The Borough Council is comprised of six members elected to serve three-year terms on a staggered basis, with two seats coming up for election each year in a three-year cycle. The borough form of government used by Saddle River is a "weak mayor / strong council" government in which council members act as the legislative body with the mayor presiding at meetings and voting only in the event of a tie. The mayor can veto ordinances subject to an override by a two-thirds majority vote of the council. The mayor makes committee and liaison assignments for council members, and most appointments are made by the mayor with the advice and consent of the council.  The mayor serves as chief executive officer, and is an ex-officio member of all municipal committees and is the approving authority in the Borough of Saddle River. Mayoral appointments to the various boards and committees in the borough are subject to confirmation by the Borough Council. Borough Council members serve on various operating committees and function in a liaison capacity to provide information and direction to the entire governing body.

, the mayor is Republican Albert J. "Al" Kurpis, whose term of office ends December 31, 2023. Members of the Saddle River Borough Council are Council President David B. Hekemian (R, 2025), John V. Azzariti Jr. (R, 2023), Duncan B. Carpenter (R, 2025), Christopher DiGirolamo (R, 2024), Jeffrey S. Liva (R, 2024; elected to serve an unexpired term), and Ravi Sachdev (R, 2023).

In August 2022, the borough council appointed Jeffrey Liva to fill the seat expiring in December 2024 that had been held by Rosario Ruffino until he resigned from office earlier that month in protest over the cost of a park project. Liva served on an interim basis until the November 2022 general election, when he was elected to serve the remainder of the term of office.

John Azzariti and Ravi Sachdev were sworn in to three-year terms by Mayor Albert Kurpis during a combined in-person/remote session in January 2021. Azzariti had been appointed to the council last July after Councilman John DeRosa resigned for professional reasons. However, Azzariti chose to run with Sachdev for two open three-year terms, seats previously held by Paul Schulstad—who resigned in March 2020—and Eric Jensen, who did not seek a new term. Christopher DiGirolamo was elected to serve the one year remaining on DeRosa's term of office.

In March 2020, the Borough Council appointed Christopher T. DiGirolamo to fill the seat expiring in December 2020 that was vacated by Paul Schulstad when he resigned from office earlier that month.

Federal, state and county representation
Saddle River is located in the 5th Congressional District and is part of New Jersey's 39th state legislative district.

Politics

Saddle River leans strongly Republican, both in terms of registration and election results. In 14 of the last 15 presidential elections, Republican candidates have carried Saddle River by margins of greater than 30 points despite their Democratic opponents winning Bergen County in seven of those elections. Bergen County also supported Republican candidates Warren G. Harding in 1920, and Charles Evans Hughes in 1916. However, Progressive Party candidate Theodore Roosevelt won the city in 1912 over New Jersey native Woodrow Wilson, and GOP nominee William Howard Taft.

Please note that election results from 1928–1956 were obtained from newspaper clippings, and may not be official. Third parties were not listed for Saddle River in most of those articles.

As of March 2011, there were a total of 2,387 registered voters in Saddle River, of which 286 (12.0% vs. 31.7% countywide) were registered as Democrats, 1,211 (50.7% vs. 21.1%) were registered as Republicans and 889 (37.2% vs. 47.1%) were registered as Unaffiliated. There was one voter registered to another party. Among the borough's 2010 Census population, 75.7% (vs. 57.1% in Bergen County) were registered to vote, including 96.0% of those ages 18 and over (vs. 73.7% countywide).

In the 2013 gubernatorial election, Republican Chris Christie received 84.7% of the vote (845 cast), ahead of Democrat Barbara Buono with 14.3% (143 votes), and other candidates with 1.0% (10 votes), among the 1,032 ballots cast by the borough's 2,475 registered voters (34 ballots were spoiled), for a turnout of 41.7%. In the 2009 gubernatorial election, Republican Chris Christie received 968 votes here (74.4% vs. 45.8% countywide), ahead of Democrat Jon Corzine with 283 votes (21.8% vs. 48.0%), Independent Chris Daggett with 39 votes (3.0% vs. 4.7%) and other candidates with one vote (0.1% vs. 0.5%), among the 1,301 ballots cast by the borough's 2,436 registered voters, yielding a 53.4% turnout (vs. 50.0% in the county).

Education
The Saddle River School District, serves students in pre-kindergarten through fifth grade at Wandell School. As of the 2018–19 school year, the district, comprised of one school, had an enrollment of 165 students and 18.5 classroom teachers (on an FTE basis), for a student–teacher ratio of 8.9:1. During the 2016–17 school year, Saddle River was tied for the 28th-smallest enrollment of any school district in the state, with 150 students.

Public school students from Saddle River attend the Ramsey Public School District's middle school and then have the option of attending either Ramsey High School or Northern Highlands Regional High School as part of sending/receiving relationships with each of the respective districts. As of the 2018–19 school year, Northern Highlands High School had an enrollment of 1,377 students and 110.4 classroom teachers (on an FTE basis), for a student–teacher ratio of 12.5:1. while Ramsey High School had an enrollment of 870 students and 80.4 classroom teachers (on an FTE basis), for a student–teacher ratio of 10.8:1. One of under ten districts with a dual send-receive relationship, three quarters of Saddle River's high school students attend Northern Highlands and about a quarter attend Ramsey High School.

All students in 8th grade from the borough, and all of Bergen County, are eligible to attend the secondary education programs offered by the Bergen County Technical Schools, which include the Bergen County Academies in Hackensack, and the Bergen Tech campus in Teterboro or Paramus. The district offers programs on a shared-time or full-time basis, with admission based on a selective application process and tuition covered by the student's home school district.

Saddle River Day School is a K–12 private school that was founded in 1957.

Transportation

Route 17 passes through Saddle River. Other main roads include West Saddle River Road, East Saddle River Road, Allendale Road, and Chestnut Ridge Road.

Saddle River is served mainly by Route 17, which runs directly through the borough, but certain portions are served by locations in Ho-Ho-Kus, Waldwick, Upper Saddle River, and Allendale. The Garden State Parkway is within a short distance of the borough at exit 171 in Woodcliff Lake.

Notable people

People who were born in, residents of, or otherwise closely associated with Saddle River include:

 Francis W. H. Adams (1904–1990), lawyer who served as New York City Police Commissioner from 1954 to 1955
 Danny Aiello (1933–2019), actor
 Gary Bettman (born 1952), Commissioner of the National Hockey League
 Mary J. Blige (born 1971), recording artist and Grammy winner
 Larry Blyden (1925–1975), actor
 Jim Burt (born 1959), former NFL player
 Tim Cahill (born 1979), former soccer player
 Nick Cannon (born 1980), actor, producer, rapper and entrepreneur
 Vince Carter (born 1977), formerly of the New Jersey Nets
 Andrew Dice Clay (born 1957), actor and comedian
 Vince Colletta (1923–1991), comic book artist
 Rocco B. Commisso (born 1949), billionaire, founder of Mediacom
 Vincent Curatola (born 1953), actor known for his role playing Johnny Sack on the television series The Sopranos
 James P. Dugan (1929–2021), former member of the New Jersey Senate who served as chairman of the New Jersey Democratic State Committee
 Alonzo Foringer (1878–1948), painter best known for his World War I Red Cross promotional poster, "The Greatest Mother in the World"
 Carol Haney (1924–1964), actress
* Mary Higgins Clark (1927–2020), author of suspense novels
 Wil Horneff (born 1979), actor
 Mark Jackson, (born 1965), former NBA player and former head coach for the Golden State Warriors
 Wyclef Jean (born 1969), three-time Grammy Award-winning rapper, singer-songwriter, musician, record producer, and politician
 A. J. Khubani (born 1959), telemarketer and founder of Telebrands
 Jason Kidd (born 1973), former player and former head coach of the New Jersey / Brooklyn Nets
 Joumana Kidd (born 1972), actress and journalist who is the former wife of Jason Kidd
 Andrew Kissel (1959–2006), murdered real estate developer
 Mariusz Kolodziej (born 1966), boxing promoter and entrepreneur
 David Lat (born 1975), blogger
 Richard Nixon (1913–1994), United States President, and First Lady Pat Nixon (1912–1993), who lived there from 1981 to 1991
 Jeffrey Nordling (born 1962), actor who appeared in the series Dirt
 Rosie O'Donnell (born 1962), comedian and television personality, homeowner since 2013
 Kenneth Pasternak (born 1954), businessman, entrepreneur
 Caroline Pennell (born 1995), singer-songwriter who was a contestant on the fifth season of The Voice
 Mario Perillo (1927–2003), tour operator
 Eleanore Pettersen (1916–2003), one of the first female architects in New Jersey
 Sam Raia, politician who served as Mayor of Saddle River and former Chairman of the New Jersey Republican State Committee
 Ja Rule (born 1976), rapper
 Lisa Scafuro (born 1958), documentary film maker and children's book author born in Saddle River who still resides part of the year
 Samantha Scarlette (born 1990), is a soft grunge / alternative rock singer-songwriter and Goth fashion designer
 Danielle Schulmann (born 1989), soccer player who plays as a forward for Sky Blue FC in the NWSL
 Daniel Silna (born 1944), co-owner of the former ABA team the Spirits of St. Louis who has profited from TV revenue earned as part of the deal in which four ABA teams were merged into the NBA
 Joseph Simmons (born 1964), a.k.a. Reverend Run, the "Run" in Run-D.M.C. and star of his family's reality show Run's House
 Russell Simmons (born 1957), godfather of hip-hop, whose house has been up for sale following his divorce from Kimora Lee Simmons
 Ben Vereen (born 1946), Tony Award-winning actor, dancer, and singer
 William B. Widnall (1906–1983), politician who served as a member of the United States House of Representatives for 24 years representing New Jersey's 7th congressional district

See also
National Register of Historic Places listings in Saddle River, New Jersey

References

Sources
 Municipal Incorporations of the State of New Jersey (according to Counties) prepared by the Division of Local Government, Department of the Treasury (New Jersey); December 1, 1958.
 Clayton, W. Woodford; and Nelson, William. History of Bergen and Passaic Counties, New Jersey, with Biographical Sketches of Many of its Pioneers and Prominent Men, Philadelphia: Everts and Peck, 1882.
 Harvey, Cornelius Burnham (ed.), Genealogical History of Hudson and Bergen Counties, New Jersey. New York: New Jersey Genealogical Publishing Co., 1900.
 Van Valen, James M. History of Bergen County, New Jersey. New York: New Jersey Publishing and Engraving Co., 1900.
 Westervelt, Frances A. (Frances Augusta), 1858–1942, History of Bergen County, New Jersey, 1630–1923, Lewis Historical Publishing Company, 1923.

External links

 Saddle River official website
 Saddle River School District
 
 School Data for the Saddle River School District, National Center for Education Statistics
 Ramsey High School
 Northern Highlands Regional High School

 
1894 establishments in New Jersey
Borough form of New Jersey government
Boroughs in Bergen County, New Jersey
Populated places established in 1894